Ahmard Rashad Hall (born November 13, 1979) is a former American football fullback. He was originally signed by the Tennessee Titans as an undrafted free agent in 2006. He played college football at Texas. He is also a United States Marine.

Early years & military service 
Ahmard Rashad Hall was born on November 13, 1979, in Galveston, Texas. He attended Angleton High School in Angleton, Texas. In high school, in addition to playing football, he was a member of the track team and the baseball team.  He was team captain of the football team and was an all-district player.

He served for four years (1998-2002) in the United States Marine Corps in the 2nd Battalion, 8th Marines as a field radio operator reaching the rank of sergeant.  He served tours of duty in Kosovo and Afghanistan. He attended the University of Texas (UT) on the G.I. Bill. He was a walk-on to the football program at UT.

College career 
Hall played fullback for The University of Texas Longhorns college football team; including their 2005 National Championship Team.

Professional career

Tennessee Titans 
Hall played in 14 games his rookie season, rushing seven times for a total of 21 yards. He caught 15 balls, for 138 yards. Ahmard also played on special teams, making five tackles. He went on to play 85 games for the Titans until 2011.

See also

References

External links 
Tennessee Titans bio

1979 births
Living people
Sportspeople from Galveston, Texas
Players of American football from Texas
American football fullbacks
United States Marine Corps personnel of the War in Afghanistan (2001–2021)
Texas Longhorns football players
Tennessee Titans players
United States Marines